Oberstaufen (Low Alemannic: Schtoufe) is a municipality  in the district of Oberallgäu in Bavarian Swabia, Germany, situated on the B 308 road from Lindau to Immenstadt.

History
It is first mentioned as Stoufun in AD 868. Historically in Swabia (Alemannia), it became part of Bavaria in 1805 with the Peace of Pressburg.

As a result of a marketing campaign by the Oberstaufen tourism industry, Oberstaufen became the first German town for which Google Street View was made available on November 2, 2010.

References

Oberallgäu